UFC 134: Silva vs. Okami (also known as UFC Rio) was a mixed martial arts (MMA) pay-per-view event held by the Ultimate Fighting Championship on August 27, 2011 at the HSBC Arena in Rio de Janeiro, Brazil. The event was the second that the UFC has hosted in Brazil, since 1998's UFC 17.5: Ultimate Brazil. UFC 134 was awarded the 2011 event of the year by Sherdog.

Background
UFC 1, 2, and 4 Tournament winner Royce Gracie was briefly linked to the event, but the rumors were refuted by UFC president Dana White.

Maiquel Falcão was scheduled  to take on Tom Lawlor at this event, but was released from the promotion in regard to a 2002 assault charge. Lawlor was instead moved to UFC 139 to take on Chris Weidman.

Mackens Semerzier was expected to face Iuri Alcântara at the event, but was replaced by UFC newcomer Antonio Carvalho. However, Carvalho was forced out of the bout with an injury and replaced by newcomer Felipe Arantes.

Alexandre Ferreira was expected to face Rousimar Palhares at this event. However, Ferreira was forced out of the bout with an injury and replaced by Dan Miller.

Mike Swick was scheduled to make his return against debuting Erick Silva on this card. However, Swick had to withdraw from the bout due to a knee injury and was replaced by Luis Ramos.

This event was awarded Sherdog's 2011 Event of the Year.

Broadcasting
UFC 134 featured two preliminary fights live on Spike TV in the US. The UFC 134 Live Prelims aired on Spike TV and were simultaneously broadcast on the digital sign above the Doubletree Hotel in the "Little Brazil" section of Times Square in New York City.

The entire card, including preliminary fights, was broadcast in Brazil through Pay-per-view channel Globosat Combate, and the main card was also broadcast by RedeTV!, marking the UFC's Brazilian broadcast television debut. Joe Rogan did not do commentary for this event because of a prior commitment. Kenny Florian substituted as a commentator instead.

Results

Bonus awards
Fighters were awarded $100,000 bonuses.

Fight of the Night: Ross Pearson vs. Edson Barboza
Knockout of the Night: Antônio Rodrigo Nogueira
Submission of the Night: Not awarded as no matches ended by submission.

Reported payout
The following is the reported payout to the fighters. It does not include sponsor money or "locker room" bonuses often given by the UFC and also do not include the UFC's traditional "fight night" bonuses
Anderson Silva: $1,000,000 (no win bonus) def. Yushin Okami: $50,000
Shogun Rua: $150,000 (no win bonus) def. Forrest Griffin: $125,000
Antônio Rodrigo Nogueira: $400,000 ($150,000 win bonus) def. Brendan Schaub: $10,000
Edson Barboza: $12,000 ($6,000 win bonus) def. Ross Pearson: $20,000
Stanislav Nedkov: $12,000 ($6,000 win bonus) def. Luiz Cane: $19,000
Thiago Tavares: $30,000 ($15,000 win bonus) def. Spencer Fisher: $26,000
Rousimar Palhares: $14,000 ($7,000 win bonus) def. Dan Miller: $15,000
Paulo Thiago: $36,000 ($18,000 win bonus) def. David Mitchell: $6,000
Raphael Assunção: $36,000 ($18,000 win bonus) def. Johnny Eduardo: $6,000
Erick Silva: $12,000 ($6,000 win bonus) def. Luis Ramos: $6,000
Yuri Alcântara: $12,000 ($6,000 win bonus) def. Felipe Arantes: $6,000
Yves Jabouin: $12,000 ($6,000 win bonus) def. Ian Loveland: $6,000

References

External links
Official UFC 134 Fight Card

Ultimate Fighting Championship events
2011 in mixed martial arts
Mixed martial arts in Brazil
International sports competitions in Rio de Janeiro (city)
2011 in Brazilian sport
August 2011 sports events in South America